Klemen Lorbek (born June 26, 1988) is a Slovenian professional basketball player and younger brother of Erazem Lorbek and Domen Lorbek. He is 198 cm tall.

Pro career
Lorbek has played with Union Olimpija, Triglav Kranj, Helios Domžale, Postojna and Hopsi Polzela.

Slovenian national team
He was member of the Slovenian Junior national team; played at the 2005 Junior European Championship in Belgrade; played at the 2006 Junior European Championship in Greece; was member of the Slovenian Cadets National team; played at the 2004 Cadets European Championship in Bulgaria.

References 
Basketball Association Of Slovenia

1988 births
Living people
KK Olimpija players
Point guards
Shooting guards
Slovenian men's basketball players
Basketball players from Ljubljana
Helios Suns players